Dharamshila Narayana Superspeciality Hospital (DNSH) is managed by Narayana Health, a Pan India Multispeciality Group founded by Dr. Devi Prasad Shetty in the year 2000 with a dream of making high quality healthcare affordable. Dharamshila Narayana Superspeciality Hospital is the first and only cancer hospital of India that has been accredited by NABH. It is also accredited by NABH for its allied specialties and labs. Dr. S. Khanna is the founder of this hospital. She got it built on 19 April 1990 after her father died of cancer. Based in New Delhi, the hospital has a medical oncology centre, radiation oncology centre, and a surgical oncology centre to diagnose and treat cancers. The first phase of the hospital was commissioned on 1 July 1994 with 100 beds. The hospital has now expanded to 350 beds and is the largest cancer hospital of north India.best hospital for cancer treatment

History
Dharamshila Cancer Foundation and Research Centre was registered as an NGO to start North India's first state-of-the-art comprehensive cancer care and research centre. The first phase of Dharamshila Hospital and Research Centre (DHRC) with 100 beds was commissioned in July 1994. In October, 2007, 250 more beds along with better cancer facilities were commissioned, making DHRC the largest cancer hospital of North India.[2]

Centers of Excellence 

Head and Neck Cancer Centre
Breast Cancer Centre
Lung Cancer Centre
Gastrointestinal Cancer Centre
Prostate & Genitourinary Cancer Centre
Gynaecological Cancer Centre
Haematology, Haemato-Oncology & Bone Marrow Transplantation
Cardiac Sciences
Emergency Medicine and Critical Care
Neurology and Neurosurgery
Nephrology, Urology and Renal Transplantation
Orthopaedics and Joint Replacement

References

External links
Dharamshila-Narayana-Superspeciality-Hospital Website
Official Website of Dharamshila Hospital And Research Centre

Cancer hospitals
Hospitals in Delhi
Hospital buildings completed in 1994
1994 establishments in Delhi
20th-century architecture in India